, also known as , in Chiyoda, Tokyo, is the main cathedral of the Japanese Orthodox Church.

History 
The founder of the Japanese Orthodox Church Ivan Dmitrievich Kasatkin (1836–1912), later St. Nicholas of Japan, was an archbishop who devoted himself to improving Japanese-Russian relations during the Meiji period. He selected the location on the hill at Kanda Surugadai. The site is on a height that overlooked the Imperial Palace. Today it is hidden among the many tall buildings erected since the 1960s.

St. Nicholas toured Russia raising funds for the cathedral. The edifice was planned by Dr. Michael A. Shchurupov, designed by Josiah Conder, and constructed by Nagasato Taisuke. The cathedral was completed on March 8, 1891, construction having begun seven years earlier. Depictions of its exotic Byzantine architecture and the unique sound of its bell often appeared in literature and illustrations of the day.

The original cathedral was seriously damaged in the Great Kantō earthquake of September 1923. The main bell tower fell on the dome, collapsing it, thus causing major damage to the cathedral. Rebuilding the cathedral became a major task for the then-ruling bishop, Archbishop Sergius (Tikhomirov), who succeeded St. Nicholas after he died in 1912. Since Russia was no longer a source of funding, Archbishop Sergius had to look for funding within Japan. A significant amount of funding was raised by numerous concerts by the cathedral choir, led by Victor A. Pokrovsky. The re-built cathedral was re-consecrated on 15 December 1929, with a shorter bell tower, a modified dome, and a less ornate interior, according to design by Okada Shinichiro.

Despite the damage caused during the 1923 earthquake, the restoration preserved important original aspects of the building, as well as the adding new aspects of cultural importance. The Agency of Cultural Affairs conducted a survey of the building, and on June 21, 1962, Nikolai-do became a, .

Gallery

References

External links

 Holy Resurrection Cathedral (Nikorai-do) Web Site, in English or Japanese

Orthodox Church in Japan
Buildings and structures in Chiyoda, Tokyo
Churches in Tokyo
Eastern Orthodox churches in Japan
Japanese Orthodox cathedrals
Buildings of the Meiji period
Neo-Byzantine architecture
Rebuilt buildings and structures in Japan
Churches completed in 1929
20th-century Eastern Orthodox church buildings
20th-century churches in Japan
1929 establishments in Japan